European route E 52 is a road part of the International E-road network. It begins in Strasbourg, France and ends in Salzburg, Austria.

Route 
The road follows: Strasbourg - Kehl - Baden-Baden - Karlsruhe - Pforzheim - Stuttgart - Ulm - Augsburg - Munich - Rosenheim - Salzburg.

External links 
 UN Economic Commission for Europe: Overall Map of E-road Network (2007)

52
E052
E052
E052